National Highway 116 (NH 116) starts from Tonk (junction with NH 12) and ends at Sawai Madhopur, both places in the state of Rajasthan.
Route= Tonk, Chandlai, Kakor, Uniara, Kushtala, Sawai Madhopur.

See also
 List of National Highways in India (by Highway Number)
 List of National Highways in India
 National Highways Development Project

References

External links
  NH network map of India

116|116
National highways in India (old numbering)